Jinyang may refer to:

Jinyang County, a county in Liangshan Yi Autonomous Prefecture, Sichuan, China
Jinyang Lake, a lake in Korea
Jinyang New District, a new urban district of the city of Guiyang, Guizhou, China
Taiyuan, formerly named Jinyang, city in Shanxi, China